Counting the Cost, or in the NIV: The Cost of Being a Disciple or in the NRSV: The Cost of Discipleship or in the NKJV: Leaving All to Follow Christ, are titles given to the Gospel of Luke passage  which includes a pair of parables told by Jesus. The first title comes from the phrase "count the cost", which occurs in the King James Version of the passage, as well as some other versions.

Narrative
The two parables are as follows:

Interpretation
Joel B. Green suggests that it is unclear what kind of tower is being referred to in the first parable, but notes that the message is that a "thoroughgoing fidelity to God's salvific aim" is required, "manifest in one's identity as a disciple of Jesus."

This verse is of great importance to Anabaptist groups such as the Hutterites and Bruderhof who interpret it as a call to live without private property or possessions.  To them, "to forsake all that he has" is an instruction to give up everything in the service of Jesus.

Eric Franklin argues that the requirement to "hate" in Luke (verse 26) is "Semitic exaggeration", and Joseph Benson envisages that hatred "signifies only an inferior degree of love".

Cornelius a Lapide in his great commentary, comments on verse 33, writing that, "this is the post-parable, and sums up the teaching of the parable itself. “He who refuseth to give up all, in order that he may live a life of evangelical perfection, cannot be My disciple as the Apostles were.” And again, It would he better for him who is unwilling to give up all, when persecution or necessity demand it and will not submit to the loss of possessions, family, and even life itself for the gospel’s sake, not to take My yoke upon him, rather than having begun to lead a Christian life, to fall away and apostatise from the faith. For such an one adds the sin of apostasy to that of unbelief, according to the Scripture: “For it had been better for them not to have known the way of righteousness, than, after they have known it, to turn from the holy commandment delivered unto them.” 2 Peter 2:21.

See also 
 Life of Jesus in the New Testament
 Luke 14
 Ministry of Jesus

References 

Parables of Jesus
Gospel of Luke